Guido Corni (August 25, 1883 – February 28, 1946) was a colonial governor of Italian Somaliland.

Life

Born in Stradella, province of Pavia, he began in his youth he followed Risorgimento ideals. He graduated in industrial chemistry and was a successful entrepreneur: he created the "Fabbrica Modenese Utensileria e Ferramenta Corni Bassani". In 1919 he enrolled in the Modena fascist party

In March 1911 Guido Corni went to Italian Tripolitania to study the possible economic development of the region. He explored all of Italian Libya in the following years. In 1923 he was promoted to become head of the fascist party in Modena.

From 1 June 1928 to 1 July 1931 Guido Corni was Governor of Somalia, promoting the integration of the local population to the Italian colonial system. He also began to improve the economy of the colony: in those years the Italian colonization of the Genale area began in southern Somalia, forming a group of small and medium-sized farms. Most settlers were former fascist militants from Turin. The first informal association of farmers, however, arose only in 1928, promoted by Corni. The primary crop of the area was cotton, grown by small farms owned by Italian settlers: about one hundred farms with an area varying between 75 and 600 hectares (with an average that oscillated around 200), with a total area of about 20,000 hectares. Cotton predominated at least until 1931, then was  replaced by banana production, whose harvest was sold to the Italian State, which sold them in Italy as a monopoly.

Corni also promoted the occupation of border areas in the Ogaden region of southern Ethiopia: the Ual-Ual occupation by his Somalian colonial troops was the cause of the start of the Italian-Ethiopian war in early 1935.

In 1935 Corni returned to Italy, where he wrote his most famous books (about "Somalia italiana", vol. I & II) and continued his successful career as entrepreneur. He was named President of the "Federazione imprese trasporti automobilistici". 

But in 1937 Corni harshly criticized Italian Fascism's growing links with Hitler's Nazism and was expelled from the Modena Fascist Party. He then retired on a huge mansion ("Castle Monfestino") he had in the Appennine mountains until his death, because of heart problems.

In March 1946 he died near Genova.

See also
 Cesare Maria De Vecchi

Notes

Bibliography
 Bartolacelli, Giuliano and Enzo. Un imprenditore modenese. Fermo Corni e il castello di Monfestino. CS Litografia, Modena, 2001
 Focherini, Franco. Il fascismo modenese minuto per minuto edizioni Il Fiorino. Modena, 2001
 Nuzzi, Olimpia. Il Corni e Modena. Corni Edizione, Modena, 2003

1883 births
1946 deaths
Governors of Italian Somaliland
People from Stradella
Italian fascists